Regional organizations (ROs) are, in a sense, international organizations (IOs), as they incorporate international membership and encompass geopolitical entities that operationally transcend a single nation state. However, their membership is characterized by boundaries and demarcations characteristic to a defined and unique geography, such as continents, or geopolitics, such as economic blocs. They have been established to foster cooperation and political and economic integration or dialogue among states or entities within a restrictive geographical or geopolitical boundary. They both reflect common patterns of development and history that have been fostered since the end of World War II as well as the fragmentation inherent in globalization, which is why their institutional characteristics vary from loose cooperation to formal regional integration. Most ROs tend to work alongside well-established multilateral organizations such as the United Nations. While in many instances a regional organization is simply referred to as an international organization, in many others it makes sense to use the term regional organization to stress the more limited scope of a particular membership. 

Examples of ROs include, amongst others, the African Union (AU), Association of Southeast Asian Nations (ASEAN), Arab League (AL), Caribbean Community (CARICOM), Council of Europe (CoE), Eurasian Economic Union (EAEU), European Union (EU), South Asian Association for Regional Cooperation (SAARC), Shanghai Cooperation Organisation, Asian-African Legal Consultative Organization (AALCO), Union for the Mediterranean (UfM), Union of South American Nations (USAN).

See also 
 International organization
 List of intergovernmental organizations
 List of regional organizations by population
 List of trade blocs
 Regional Economic Communities
 Regional integration
 Supranational union

References

Further reading
 Tanja A. Börzel and Thomas Risse (2016), The Oxford Handbook of Comparative Regionalism. Oxford: Oxford University Press.
Rodrigo Tavares (2009), Regional Security: The Capacity of International Organizations. London and New York: Routledge.

International relations
Organization